Garden City bus station is located in Brisbane, Australia serving the suburb of Upper Mount Gravatt and Westfield Garden City. It opened on 22 April 1999.

It became a junction station when the South East Busway opened with Upper Mount Gravatt busway station built below it.

References

External links
Garden City Interchange TransLink

Bus stations in Brisbane
Transport infrastructure completed in 1999
1999 establishments in Australia